Catoptria aurora is a moth in the family Crambidae. It was described by Stanisław Błeszyński in 1965. It is found in Amur in the Russian Far East.

References

Crambini
Moths described in 1965
Moths of Asia